Grand Chambéry is the communauté d'agglomération, an intercommunal structure, centred on the city of Chambéry. It is located in the Savoie department, in the Auvergne-Rhône-Alpes region, southeastern France. It was created in January 2017. Its seat is in Chambéry. Its area is 526.5 km2. Its population was 134,377 in 2017, of which 58,919 in Chambéry proper.

Composition
The communauté d'agglomération consists of the following 38 communes:

Aillon-le-Jeune
Aillon-le-Vieux
Arith
Barberaz
Barby
Bassens
Bellecombe-en-Bauges
Challes-les-Eaux
Chambéry
Le Châtelard
Cognin
La Compôte
Curienne
Les Déserts
Doucy-en-Bauges
École
Jacob-Bellecombette
Jarsy
Lescheraines
Montagnole
La Motte-en-Bauges
La Motte-Servolex
Le Noyer
Puygros
La Ravoire
Saint-Alban-Leysse
Saint-Baldoph
Saint-Cassin
Sainte-Reine
Saint-François-de-Sales
Saint-Jean-d'Arvey
Saint-Jeoire-Prieuré
Saint-Sulpice
Sonnaz
Thoiry
La Thuile
Verel-Pragondran
Vimines

References

Chambery
Chambery